Oreophrynella huberi is a species of toad in the family Bufonidae.
It is endemic to Venezuela. 
Its natural habitats are subtropical or tropical moist montane forests and swamps.

Conservation status
It is classed as vulnerable as it is known from a single location in Bolivar State, Cerro El Sol, to the north-east of the Auyán-tepui.

References

External links

Oreophrynella
Endemic fauna of Venezuela
Amphibians described in 1987
Taxonomy articles created by Polbot
Amphibians of the Tepuis